Marzia Kjellberg, better known online as just “Marzia,” is an Italian Internet personality, fashion designer, and entrepreneur.

Marzia or MARZIA can also refer to:

Marzia (given name), and Italian given name
MARZIA, a brand of Nardi, an Italian agricultural manufacturing group

See also 
 Marcia (disambiguation)